Lyudmila Andreyevna Kondratyeva (born 11 April 1958) is a Russian former track and field athlete, who competed for the Soviet Union and is the 1980 Olympic 100 m champion.

Kondratyeva began athletics at age 11 at the Children and Youth Sport School in Shakhty, her first trainer being Lyudmila Mikhailovna Pavlenko. Two years later she passed exams into Rostov on Don Children and Youth Sport School, created in 1971, where she was coached by Nina Vasilyevna Lazarchenko. In 1973 she became a member of the Soviet Union National Youth Team, and in 1974 - of the Soviet Union National Team. At the 1975 European Youth Championships Kondratyeva finished 4th in the 200m and in the 4 × 100 m relay. Four years later she became the winner of the 200 m at the 1978 European Championships, where she also won a gold in the 4 × 100 m relay event.

Now one of the medal favourites for the 1980 Summer Olympics, which were held in Moscow, she also ran a non-recognised World Record just before the Olympics.  The final was a close race, with the first 5 finishing within 1 tenth of a second. A photo finish showed that Kondratyeva had beaten Marlies Göhr of East Germany by just 0.01 seconds. Kondratyeva pulled her hamstring at the finish, thereby not allowing her to run the 200 m or the 4 × 100 m relay.

Unable to compete at the 1984 Summer Olympics due to the boycott led by the Soviet Union, Kondratyeva could not defend her Olympic title. She retired after that season and married Yuriy Sedykh, two time Olympic champion in the hammer throw, although they would later divorce. The pair had a daughter, Oksana Kondratyeva, who followed in her father's footsteps and became an international hammer thrower.

She came out of retirement to compete at the 1988 Seoul Olympic Games. She made the semi-finals of the 100m and won a bronze medal as part of the Soviet women's 4 × 100 m relay.

Bibliography

References

1958 births
Living people
People from Shakhty
Russian female sprinters
Soviet female sprinters
Athletes (track and field) at the 1980 Summer Olympics
Athletes (track and field) at the 1988 Summer Olympics
Olympic athletes of the Soviet Union
Olympic gold medalists for the Soviet Union
Olympic bronze medalists for the Soviet Union
World record setters in athletics (track and field)
European Athletics Championships medalists
Medalists at the 1988 Summer Olympics
Medalists at the 1980 Summer Olympics
Olympic gold medalists in athletics (track and field)
Olympic bronze medalists in athletics (track and field)
Olympic female sprinters
Friendship Games medalists in athletics
Sportspeople from Rostov Oblast